Paulo Sérgio Rosa, usually known as Viola (born 1 January 1969), is a former Brazilian footballer who played as a forward. He was given his nickname in his youth, which was a reference to the brand–name of his first pair of football boots.

Career
Viola is famous for his strong personality on the pitch and great appearances in many teams he has played for throughout his long career. His first great appearance was in his second match, in the final game of 1988 Campeonato Paulista (1st Division Championship of São Paulo State) between Corinthians and Guarani, regarded by the press as having a better team. Viola was called just because the main Corinthians forward, Edmar, was called by the Brazil national football team and then sold to Pescara – and because his main substitute, Marcos Roberto, was with a broken arm. Viola was not having a great offensive exhibition, but could score the title goal in the extra time – by putting his leg in the way of a lopsided shot from Wilson Mano, turning it into an assist.

Despite becoming a sudden star, Viola did not have a regular basis of good exhibitions and passed through some loanings until 1992 – he was not part of the first Corinthians title at Brasileirão, in 1990, when he was loaned to São José. He then had a reasonable year in 1992, not resembling anymore the skinny boy from 1988. In 1993, Viola almost did another title goal to Corinthians in the Campeonato Paulista, celebrating it with a pig imitation – mocking the Palmeiras nickname. But in the second final match, the rivals won the tournament. Nevertheless, Viola continued to celebrate his goals in joking ways, increasing his popularity. He was then first called by the Brazil team, going to 1993 Copa América and to 1994 FIFA World Cup when he came as a substitute in the extra time, bringing an electric performance to a tied game. Viola also ended 1994 as runner-up with Corinthians in the Brasileirão.

By the beginning of 1995, Viola was then sold to Valencia, but remained for more six months in Corinthians - the winning the Campeonato Paulista and the Copa do Brasil. However, he did not suit himself in Spain. Despite having reasonable goal numbers, he chose to come back to Brazil by the mid of 1996, even signing with Palmeiras. He did not have a regular frequency of good exhibitions, and left the club after the runner-up campaign in the 1997 Brasileirão, signing with Santos. He then earned again good performances, leading the team to the semifinals of the Campeonato Paulista and of the Brasileirão, and to the 1998 Copa Conmebol title. He also ended the Brasileirão as top scorer. His career's last good moments were in Vasco da Gama, by 1999 and 2000, as a supporting member of the runner-up squad of 2000 FIFA World Club Cup and of the 2000 Copa Mercosur and Brasileirão champions.

Viola then had an unsuccessful return to Santos in 2001. In he left Brazil again to join Turkish side Gaziantepspor, where he scored 18 goals in 46 Super Lig matches during a -season spell. In mid-2003, back to Brazil, Viola would defend many other teams, alternating them with some showbol matches and even a reality television show participation by 2010. His last coming back trial was in Taboão da Serra, in 2015.

Honours

Club

Corinthians 
São Paulo State League: 1988, 1995
Copa do Brasil: 1995

Santos 
Copa Conmebol: 1998

Vasco da Gama 
Brazilian League: 2000
Copa Mercosur: 2000

International
Brazil
FIFA World Cup: 1994

Individual
São Paulo state league's top scorer: 1993
Brazilian league's top scorer: 1998
Copa Conmebol's top scorer: 1998

References

External links

Guardian Article

1969 births
Living people
Brazilian footballers
Brazilian expatriate footballers
Brazilian expatriate sportspeople in Spain
Brazilian expatriate sportspeople in Turkey
Expatriate footballers in Turkey
Expatriate footballers in Spain
CR Vasco da Gama players
Association football forwards
Guarani FC players
Sociedade Esportiva Palmeiras players
Sport Club Corinthians Paulista players
São José Esporte Clube players
Esporte Clube Bahia players
Uberlândia Esporte Clube players
Duque de Caxias Futebol Clube players
Campeonato Brasileiro Série A players
Valencia CF players
La Liga players
Gaziantepspor footballers
Süper Lig players
Brusque Futebol Clube players
1993 Copa América players
1994 FIFA World Cup players
FIFA World Cup-winning players
Brazil international footballers
The Farm (TV series) contestants
Clube Atlético Taboão da Serra players
Footballers from São Paulo